Prelude to History is the second and final studio album by German girl group Preluders. It was released on 27 September 2004 by Cheyenne Records, Polydor and Zeitgeist. A collection of cover versions of songs from the 1960s, 1970s, and 1980s, it features production by Thorsten Brötzmann, Andre "Brix" Buchmann, and Ingo Politz. Upon its release, the album underperformed, debuting and peaking at number 44 on the German Albums Chart. It spawned two moderately successful singles with "Walking on Sunshine" and a remake of The Contours' "Do You Love Me", resulting in lackluster sales in general.

Track listing

Charts

Weekly charts

References

2004 albums
Covers albums
Preluders albums